The Wales national Under 20 rugby team is for Welsh rugby union players aged 20 or under on 1 January of the year during which they are selected.

Under 20 age grade rugby came into existence, as a result of the IRB combining the Under 19 Rugby World Championship and Under 21 Rugby World Championship into a single IRB Junior World Championship tournament. They also compete in the Six Nations Under 20s Championship.

Six Nations Under-20 Championship 
Wales finished second in the 2008 tournament, losing only to England.

In 2013 Wales were denied a Grand Slam in their final match against England, and ultimately placing second on points difference.

Wales finally achieved a Grand Slam and their first U20 title in 2016, defeating Italy on the final week 35–6, having been level 6–6 at half time. They also secured their first Triple Crown at this age group.

Junior World Championships
In June 2008 Wales hosted the 2008 IRB Junior World Championship. As hosts they played all their group matches at the Liberty Stadium in Swansea, starting against Italy on Friday 6 June, before further ties against Japan and France. Wales won all three group matches before losing the semi-final to New Zealand and subsequently losing the 3rd place play-off to South Africa.

For the tournament the same management team remained from the 2008 U20 Six Nations; head coach Patrick Horgan and assistant coaches Rob Appleyard and Wayne Jones. Sam Warbuton remained as captain.

For the next two Junior World championships, Wales alongside France will have to start the pool stages with a three-point deficit, following a brawl between the two sides in the 2008 tournament.

At the 2010 IRB Junior World Championship the Welsh squad won 2 games in the preliminary round against Samoa and Fiji while losing to New Zealand. At the playoffs for the 5th–8th place they first drew with Argentina 19–19 but lost in a drop goal shootout 9–8 and then met Fiji for a second time, again winning by 39–15 to finish in 7th place.

In 2011, after winning their opening game 34–8 against Argentina they were on the receiving end of a 92–0 thrashing by New Zealand in Italy, a record defeat for the side.

In 2012 Wales beat the baby All Blacks 9–6, the first time New Zealand have ever been defeated in the competition. This was also the first Welsh win against New Zealand at any level since 1954. However, later in the tournament Wales lost 30-6 to New Zealand in the semi-final.

2013 was the sides most successful year, making it to the final, where they faced England. Wales lead 15–3 at half time, but ultimately lost 23–15.

Current squad

Wales Under 20 squad for the 2023 Six Nations Under 20s Championship.

Management

Results and statistics

Honours
  World Rugby Under 20 Championship
  Runners-up (1): 2013
  Six Nations Under 20s Championship
  Winners (1): 2016
  Grand Slam (1): 2016
  Triple Crown (1): 2016

References 

Rugby union
European national under-20 rugby union teams

es:Selección juvenil de rugby de Gales